is the second studio album by Miyavi. It was released on December 2, 2003.

Track listing

References

2003 albums
Miyavi albums
Free-Will albums

el:Galyuu
sv:Galyuu